Loutitt is a surname. Notable people with the surname include: 

Alexandria Loutitt (born 2004), Canadian ski jumper
Jason Loutitt (1964-2021), Canadian runner and cyclist

See also
Louttit